Anastasia Pavlyuchenkova was the defending champion, but lost to Svetlana Kuznetsova in the final, 2–6, 1–6.

Seeds
The top four seeds received a bye into the second round.

Draw

Finals

Top half

Bottom half

Qualifying

Seeds

Qualifiers

Lucky losers

Draw

First qualifier

Second qualifier

Third qualifier

Fourth qualifier

References
 Main draw
 Qualifying draw

2015 WTA Tour
2015 Women's Singles